The Prado in Madrid, officially the Museo Nacional del Prado, is the main Spanish national art museum.

Prado may also refer to:

Places
Prado, Bahia, a municipality in the state of Bahia, Brazil
Prado, Tolima, a town in Colombia
 Paseo del Prado, Havana, a street in Cuba
 Prado, a beach in Marseille, France
Monte Prado, a mountain in northern Italy
 Prado, a locality in Pavia, Italy
Prado (Melgaço), a parish in Melgaço, Portugal
Prado (Cabrales), a parish in Cabrales, Spain
 Paseo del Prado, Madrid, Spain
Prado, Spain, a municipality in Zamora, Spain
 Prado Dam, a dam near Corona, California, United States
Prado, Montevideo, a neighbourhood in Montevideo, Uruguay
 Parque Prado, a park in Montevideo, Uruguay

Train stations
 Prado (TransMilenio), a station of the TransMilenio mass-transit system of Bogotá, Colombia
 Prado (Medellín Metro), a station of the metro system of Medellín, Colombia
 Lo Prado metro station, Santiago, Chile
 Rond-Point du Prado, a Marseille Metro station

Other uses 
 Prado (footballer) (born 1999), Angolan footballer
 Prado (surname), a surname
 Prado (murderer) (died 1888), Spanish murderer executed in France by guillotine
 PRADO (framework), a PHP application development framework
 Public Register of Travel and Identity Documents Online of the Council of the European Union
 Toyota Land Cruiser Prado, a four-wheel-drive vehicle

See also
 el Prado (disambiguation)
 Lo Prado, Santiago, Chile
 Prada
 Prade
 Villa del Prado (disambiguation)